The 2010 Hall of Fame Tennis Championships (also known as the Campbell's Hall of Fame Tennis Championships for sponsorship reasons) was a men's tennis tournament played on outdoor grass courts. It was the 35th edition of the Hall of Fame Tennis Championships, and was part of the ATP World Tour 250 series of the 2010 ATP World Tour. It took place at the International Tennis Hall of Fame in Newport, Rhode Island, United States, from July 5 through July 11, 2010. Fifth-seeded Mardy Fish won the singles title.

Entrants

Seeds

Seedings are based on the rankings of June 21, 2010.

Other entrants
The following players received wildcards into the singles main draw
  Ryan Harrison
  Denis Kudla
  Nicolas Mahut

The following players received entry from the qualifying draw:
  Richard Bloomfield
  Sergei Bubka
  Raven Klaasen
  Alexander Peya

Finals

Singles

 Mardy Fish defeated  Olivier Rochus 5–7, 6–3, 6–4
 It was Fish's first title of the year and 4th of his career.

Doubles

 Carsten Ball /  Chris Guccione defeated  Santiago González /  Travis Rettenmaier 6–3, 6–4

External links
 

Campbell's Hall of Fame Tennis Championships

Campbell's Hall of Fame Tennis Championships
Campbell's Hall of Fame Tennis Championships
2010